Lynn Hoffman may refer to:

Lynn Hoffman (family therapist) (1924–2017), US social worker, family therapist, author and historian of family therapy
Lynn Hoffman (author), Philadelphia novelist